Vleminckx is a surname. Notable people with the surname include:

Andras Vleminckx, Belgian music producer
Björn Vleminckx (born 1985), Belgian footballer
Tim Vleminckx (born 1987), Belgian footballer

Surnames of Belgian origin